Oalex Anderson (born 11 November 1995 in Barrouallie) is a Vincentian professional footballer who plays for North Carolina FC in USL League One and the Saint Vincent and the Grenadines national team. Anderson is known by the nickname "Bounty" for his prolific goal scoring.

Club career
Anderson has played for System 3 FC of the NLA Premier League, the top tier of football in Saint Vincent and the Grenadines. Anderson was the league's top scorer for the 2013/2014 season. In September 2014, System 3 loaned Anderson to Grenades FC of the Antigua and Barbuda Premier Division, along with national teammate Kevin Francis, on 6-month deals. Only days later, Anderson scored his first goal for the club on 27 September 2014 in a 6–3 league victory over Old Road FC on his league debut. During his time with the club, Anderson appeared in 18 matches, finishing second in the league with 12 goals.

Anderson joined USL club Seattle Sounders FC 2, of which fellow Vincentian Ezra Hendrickson was coach, in March 2015. He made his debut for the club on 11 April 2015, in a 2–1 victory over Portland Timbers 2 as an 82nd-minute substitute for Aaron Kovar. The score was tied 1–1 as he made his entrance but minutes later, he was taken down in the box for a penalty which Pablo Rossi converted to give S2 the victory. Anderson scored his first goal for the club on 15 May 2015, the game-winner of a 3–1 victory over Oklahoma City Energy. On 12 July 2015, Anderson scored his first brace for the club before being carted off with an injury in the 30th minute as Sounders 2 beat Arizona United, 4–0. Anderson's 2nd-minute first goal was, at that point, the fastest goal in club history. For his efforts, Anderson was named to the USL's Team of the Week.

On 4 December 2015, it was announced that Anderson would return to S2 for the 2016 USL season, along with international teammate Myron Samuel. It was announced on 1 March 2016 that Anderson had been signed by the Seattle Sounders FC of Major League Soccer. That year the club won its first MLS Cup. Following the 2016 season, it was announced that the club would not extend Anderson's contract.

After a four year gaps because of a serious injury, Anderson signed with the Richmond Kickers on August 31, 2020.

Anderson signed with North Carolina FC on 18 January 2022.

International career
Anderson made his international debut on 2 February 2014 in a friendly against Dominica. After a strong start to his international career, Anderson was named to the squad for the 2014 Windward Islands Tournament and 2014 Caribbean Cup qualification. Anderson went on to score two goals during the Windwards Islands Tournament and five during Caribbean Cup qualification before SVG were eliminated, making him ranked among the top goal scorers during qualification.

In May 2015, Anderson was called up for two Under-23 matches against Dominica in 2015 CONCACAF Men's Olympic Qualifying Championship qualification and two matches with the senior squad against Guyana as part of its opening round of 2018 FIFA World Cup qualification. Anderson scored a goal and was named team captain for the opening U23 match as SVG won 2–0. Anderson scored again in the second fixture, a 3–0 victory, sending SVG to the next round of qualification. Anderson was called up to the U23 squad again in August 2015 for matches against Haiti in the final round of qualification.

Honours
NLA Premier League Golden Boot: 2013–14
Antigua and Barbuda Premier Division Golden Boot: Runner-up 2014–15
Major League Soccer MLS Cup: 2016

References

External links
Soccerway profile
Caribbean Football Database Profile
ABFA Profile

1995 births
Living people
Saint Vincent and the Grenadines footballers
Saint Vincent and the Grenadines expatriate footballers
Saint Vincent and the Grenadines international footballers
Association football forwards
Richmond Kickers players
Tacoma Defiance players
Seattle Sounders FC players
USL Championship players
USL League One players
Major League Soccer players
Expatriate soccer players in the United States
Saint Vincent and the Grenadines expatriate sportspeople in the United States
Saint Vincent and the Grenadines expatriate sportspeople in Antigua and Barbuda
Expatriate footballers in Antigua and Barbuda
People from Saint Patrick Parish, Saint Vincent and the Grenadines
North Carolina FC players